KDYN (1540 AM) is a radio station broadcasting a country music format. Licensed to serve Ozark, Arkansas, United States, the station is currently owned by Ozark Communications.

References

External links

Country radio stations in the United States
DYN
Radio stations established in 1975
1975 establishments in Arkansas